Jens Morgan Nilsson (born 3 April 1971) is a Swedish former footballer who played as a midfielder. During his club career, Nilsson played for Gnosjö IF, GAIS, Örgryte IS, and Lindome GIF. He made three appearances for the Sweden national team.

Honours

Svenska Cupen: 1999-2000

External links

1967 births
Living people
Swedish footballers
Sweden international footballers
Association football midfielders
Allsvenskan players
GAIS players
Örgryte IS players